Nucleosome assembly protein 1 like 5 is a protein that in humans is encoded by the NAP1L5 gene.

Function

This gene encodes a protein that shares sequence similarity to nucleosome assembly factors, but may be localized to the cytoplasm rather than the nucleus. Expression of this gene is downregulated in hepatocellular carcinomas. This gene is located within a differentially methylated region (DMR) and is imprinted and paternally expressed. There is a related pseudogene on chromosome 4. [provided by RefSeq, Nov 2015].

References

Further reading